The Collège nordique francophone (Northern Francophone College) is the only francophone college in the Northwest Territories. It was founded in 2011 and started offering courses in 2012. It is based in Yellowknife.

References

External links
Collège nordique francophone

French-language universities and colleges in Canada outside Quebec
Universities and colleges in the territories of Canada
Education in the Northwest Territories